The Galician Transversal Railway (German: Galizische Transversalbahn, Polish: Galicyjska Kolej Transwersalna) was a railway system, opened in 1884 in the province of Galicia (Austria-Hungary). It was a state-owned enterprise which ran from west to east, along northern side of the Carpathian Mountains. 

The line was constructed in order to connect already existing lines into a continuous east-west route parallel to the main Galician Railway of Archduke Charles Louis route Kraków - Lwów, which would be less exposed to attacks in a war with the Russian Empire. The railway was also supposed to activate underdeveloped mountainous areas of Galicia.

The Transversal Railway started at Čadca (present day Slovakia), and ended in Husiatyn (present day Ukraine), with total length of around 800 kilometers. Main towns located along the route are:
 Żywiec,
 Nowy Sącz,
 Jasło,
 Krosno,
 Sanok,
 Zagórz,
 Chyrów,
 Sambor,
 Drohobycz,
 Stryj,
 Stanisławów.

Before construction of the Transversal Railway began, several connections had already existed, such as:
 Zagórz – Krościenko – Chyrów (part of the Łupków – Przemyśl connection of the First Hungarian-Galician Railway, 1872),
 The Dniestr Railway, Chyrów – Sambor – Stryj (1872),
 The Archduke Albrecht Railway, Stryj – Dolina – Stanislawów (1873).
 Nowy Sącz – Stroze (part of the Tarnów – Plaveč connection, 1876)

The lines built within the Transversal Railway project totaled 577 kilometers and these were:
 Čadca – Zwardoń – Żywiec – Sucha Beskidzka – Chabówka – Limanowa – Nowy Sącz (together with side lines Suchá – Skawina – Kraków-Plaszów, and Skawina – Oświęcim),
 Stróze – Jasło – Sanok – Zagórz (together with a side line to Gorlice),
 Chryplin (near Stanisławów) – Buczacz – Czortków – Husiatyn.

See also 
 Imperial Royal Austrian State Railways
 History of rail transport in Poland
 Galician Railway of Archduke Charles Louis

International railway lines
Railway lines in Poland
Railway lines in Slovakia
Railway lines in Ukraine
1520 mm gauge railways in Ukraine
1520 mm gauge railways in Slovakia
1520 mm gauge railways in Poland
Defunct railway companies of Austria
Establishments in the Kingdom of Galicia and Lodomeria